Nebraska Highway 11 (N-11) is a state highway in central and northern Nebraska, United States. Its southern terminus is at Interstate 80 (I-80) south of Wood River. Its northern terminus is at the South Dakota border north of Butte. The highway goes through the eastern portion of the Sand Hills.

Route description

N-11 begins at Exit 300 of I-80, which is also the exit for NE Spur 40D. It goes north through farmland into Wood River, where it crosses over U.S. Route 30 in Nebraska (US 30) without an interchange. Access to US 30 is available via Link 40G  to the north. It continues north through Cairo, then meets Nebraska Highway 58. The two highways run concurrent, heading northeast to Dannebrog, where they separate. N-11 proceeds north to Elba, then turns northwest on an alignment that parallels the North Loup River. It passes through Ord and Burwell, then turns north after passing Nebraska Highway 91. N-11 continues north into areas of prairie and meets U.S. Route 20 in Atkinson. N-11 goes north into farmland some more, briefly goes east, then turns north to go through Butte, where it meets Nebraska Highway 12 (N-12). After a brief concurrency with N-12, N-11 turns north and goes into South Dakota, where the road continues as South Dakota Highway 43.

Major intersections

See also

 List of state highways in Nebraska

References

External links

 Nebraska Roads: NE 11-20

011
Transportation in Hall County, Nebraska
Transportation in Howard County, Nebraska
Transportation in Greeley County, Nebraska
Transportation in Valley County, Nebraska
Transportation in Garfield County, Nebraska
Transportation in Holt County, Nebraska
Transportation in Boyd County, Nebraska